The Best of Generation X is a compilation album of English punk rock band Generation X.

It was released by Chrysalis Records in 1985 in response to the international success that the band's frontman Billy Idol had recently achieved, as well as the media interest generated by bassist Tony James' then current project, Sigue Sigue Sputnik.

The album contains tracks from all three Generation X studio albums, and includes all of their singles except for debut single "Your Generation."

Track listing

The Best of Generation X

References 

1985 greatest hits albums
Compilation albums by British artists
Generation X (band) albums
Chrysalis Records compilation albums